Sarus or Saurus (d. 413 AD) was a Gothic chieftain, known as a particularly brave and skillful warrior. He became a commander for the emperor Honorius. He was known for his hostility to the prominent Gothic brothers-in-law Alaric I and Athaulf, and was the brother of Sigeric, who ruled the Goths briefly in 415.

Career
Nothing is known of his life before he comes to notice in 406 commanding a force of Gothic troops, along with other barbarian foederati, against the invasion of Italy by Radagaisus of 405–6. Roman and federate troops ultimately defeated the invaders at the Battle of Faesulae. 

In 407 he was sent against the British usurper Constantine III. First he defeated and killed Iustinianus, one of Constantine's magistri militum, then tricked and killed the other, Nebiogastes. Then Sarus laid siege to Constantine himself in Valentia, but fled back to Italy at the approach of Constantine's new generals Edobichus and Gerontius, being forced to surrender all his booty to Bacaudae (late Roman bandits or rebels) for passage over the Alps. As he must have commanded an army, he may have been appointed magister militum (general) for this expedition; elsewhere he is said to have had a following or warband of only about three hundred.

Early in 408, whilst commanding a force of barbarians at Ravenna, Stilicho induced him to mutiny in an attempt to prevent Honorius from travelling there. Then, when Stilicho was recalled by the Emperor under suspicion of treachery, Sarus, apparently incensed that Stilicho continued to obey orders and refused to use the barbarian troops on hand to defend himself, fought his way through Stilicho's Hun bodyguard to protest. Later in 408, after the fall of Stilicho, Sarus' name was put forward as Stilicho's successor as the most suitable candidate for the office of magister militum in praesenti (supreme commander), but the Emperor Honorius refused to promote him. It is possible his resentment of Honorius, as borne out by later actions, started here 

We next hear of Sarus in 410, apparently subsisting independently in the region of Picenum. Athaulf, who was coming to join his brother-in-law Alaric, decided to attack him in passing and Sarus, thinking his force of three hundred would be no match for the Gothic army, fled to Honorius. Later that year, when Alaric was conducting negotiations with Honorius near Ravenna, Sarus with his warband attacked him, seemingly on his own initiative. This prompted Alaric to finally give up on negotiations and sack Rome on August 24.

Death and aftermath
Sarus seems to have stayed in the service of the Emperor for the next two years, but he developed a grudge against Honorius, who had failed to investigate or avenge the murder of his servant. In 412 another usurper, Jovinus, approached from Northern Gaul, supported at first by Ataulf; Sarus went to join Jovinus. Sarus had only twenty eight men with him, but Ataulf gathered a force of ten thousand to waylay him. Even so, Sarus fought with marvellous courage and was only with difficulty taken alive, and shortly killed. 

Sarus' last contribution to the events of the time were posthumous. Ataulf had been foolish enough to take one of Sarus' followers into his own service; this man waited till Ataulf visited his stable alone and there killed him (September 415). Sarus' brother, Sigeric, then ruled for seven days before Wallia killed him and took over the kingship.

Sarus was active for only six years in an extremely confused period, yet he made his mark as a figure of some importance in several large and small events of those years. Unfortunately a bald account of his deeds gives a very disjointed picture of him, but he obviously made an impression on those of his time, who describe him as "a brave and invincible warrior", possessing "marvellous heroism", who "excelled all the other confederates in power and rank" and had "intrepidity" and "experience in warlike affairs".

Notes

References

Ancient
 Olympiodorus of Thebes, Histories (existing only in 10th century summary by Photius)
 Orosius, Historiarum Adversum Paganos
 Philostorgius, Historia Ecclesiastica
 Sozomen, Historia Ecclesiastica
 Zosimus, Historia Nova

Modern
 
 
Doyle, C. (2018). Honorius: The Fight for the Roman West AD395-423. Roman Imperial Biographies. Routledge. New York & London. https://www.routledge.com/Honorius-The-Fight-for-the-Roman-West-AD-395-423/Doyle/p/book/9781138190887.
Doyle, C. (2014). The Endgame of Treason: Suppressing Rebellion and Usurpation in the Late Roman Empire AD 397‑411. National University of Ireland Galway. Unpublished doctoral thesis. https://aran.library.nuigalway.ie/handle/10379/4631

External links

Translation of Zosimus' Historia Nova (published in 1814), book 1, book 2, book 3, book 4, book 5, book 6 
 Orosius, Histories against the Pagans, Book VII.

 Epitome of the Ecclesiastical History of Philostorgius from The Tertullian Project

Year of birth unknown
412 deaths
Gothic warriors
5th-century Romans of Gothic descent
Magistri militum